Euploea midamus, the blue spotted crow, is a butterfly found in India and South-East Asia that belongs to the crows and tigers, that is, the danaid group of the brush-footed butterflies family.

See also
Danainae
Nymphalidae
List of butterflies of India
List of butterflies of India (Nymphalidae)

References
 

Euploea
Butterflies of Asia
Butterflies described in 1758
Taxa named by Carl Linnaeus
Butterflies of Indochina